Responsible Child is a 2019 British television film directed by Nick Holt and written by Sean Buckley. The film is based on a true story and stars Billy Barratt in the role of Ray, a 12-year-old boy who goes to trial accused of killing his mother's boyfriend. It was produced by Kudos with 72 Films for BBC Two.

At the 48th International Emmy Awards, Barratt won the award for Best Performance by an Actor, making him the youngest person ever to do so.

Cast  
Billy Barratt	...	Ray
James Tarpey	...	Nathan
Tom Burke	...	William Ramsden
Neal Barry	...	Kevin - Appropriate Adult
Tina Harris	...	Sergeant Lucas
Owen McDonnell	...	Pete
Michelle Fairley	...	Kerry
Debbie Honeywood	...	Veronica
Shaun Dingwall	...	Scott
Kirsten Wright	...	Serena
Zachary Barnfield	...	Christie
Angela Wynter	...	Grace
Matthew Aubrey	...	Gary
Zita Sattar	...	Sam Delaney
Stephen Boxer	...	Judge Walden

Accolades

References

External links 
Responsible Child on IMDb

British television films
2010s English-language films
British films based on actual events
British legal films
International Emmy Award for Best TV Movie or Miniseries